The 2001 Kansas City Royals season involved the Royals finishing 5th in the American League Central with a record of 65 wins and 97 losses.

Offseason
 January 8, 2001: Johnny Damon was traded as part of a 3-team trade by the Kansas City Royals with Mark Ellis to the Oakland Athletics. The Oakland Athletics sent Ben Grieve to the Tampa Bay Devil Rays. The Oakland Athletics sent Ángel Berroa and A. J. Hinch to the Kansas City Royals. The Tampa Bay Devil Rays sent Cory Lidle to the Oakland Athletics. The Tampa Bay Devil Rays sent Roberto Hernandez to the Kansas City Royals.
March 23, 2001: Trenidad Hubbard was signed as a free agent with the Kansas City Royals.

Regular season

Season standings

Record vs. opponents

Notable transactions
May 23, 2001: Trenidad Hubbard was released by the Kansas City Royals.
June 5, 2001: Paul Byrd was traded by the Philadelphia Phillies to the Kansas City Royals for José Santiago.
June 24, 2001: Brent Mayne was traded by the Colorado Rockies to the Kansas City Royals for Sal Fasano and Mac Suzuki.
July 31, 2001: Rey Sánchez was traded by the Kansas City Royals to the Atlanta Braves for Brad Voyles (minors) and Alejandro Machado (minors).

Roster

Player stats

Batting

Starters by position 
Note: Pos = Position; G = Games played; AB = At bats; H = Hits; Avg. = Batting average; HR = Home runs; RBI = Runs batted in

Other batters 
Note: G = Games played; AB = At bats; H = Hits; Avg. = Batting average; HR = Home runs; RBI = Runs batted in

Pitching

Starting pitchers 
Note: G = Games pitched; IP = Innings pitched; W = Wins; L = Losses; ERA = Earned run average; SO = Strikeouts

Other pitchers 
Note: G = Games pitched; IP = Innings pitched; W = Wins; L = Losses; ERA = Earned run average; SO = Strikeouts

Relief pitchers 
Note: G = Games pitched; W = Wins; L = Losses; SV = Saves; ERA = Earned run average; SO = Strikeouts

Farm system

Notes

References
2001 Kansas City Royals team at Baseball-Reference
2001 Kansas City Royals team at baseball-almanac.com

Kansas City Royals seasons
Kansas City Royals season
Kansas